Gordonsville Historic District is a national historic district located at Gordonsville, Orange County, Virginia. It encompasses 85 contributing buildings and 2 contributing structures in the town of Gordonsville.  They include 19th- and early 20th-century residential, commercial and institutional buildings in a variety of popular architectural styles including Colonial Revival, Greek Revival, and Georgian Revival styles. Notable buildings include the E.J. Faulconer House (c. 1856), Faulconer-Schlosser House (1868), Linney-Barbour Building (1870), Swan-Payne House (1901), Magnolia House (c. 1873), Gordonsville Christian Church (18523, c. 1920), Gordonsville Presbyterian Church (1855), Gordonsville Methodist Church (1873), St. Mark's Catholic (c. 1880), Christ Episcopal Church (c. 1875), Grammar School (1877-1878), Memorial Hall, Sneed's Store (c. 1855), Allman Building, Gordonsville Motor Car Company Building (c. 1922), The Old Oaken Bucket (c. 1920), and the Blakey Building (1916).  Located in the district is the separately listed Exchange Hotel.

It was listed on the National Register of Historic Places in 1983.

References

Historic districts in Orange County, Virginia
Greek Revival architecture in Virginia
Colonial Revival architecture in Virginia
Georgian Revival architecture in Virginia
National Register of Historic Places in Orange County, Virginia
Historic districts on the National Register of Historic Places in Virginia